The Kentucky General Assembly, also called the Kentucky Legislature, is the state legislature of the U.S. state of Kentucky.  It comprises the Kentucky Senate and the Kentucky House of Representatives.

The General Assembly meets annually in the state capitol building in Frankfort, Kentucky, convening on the first Tuesday after the first Monday in January. In even-numbered years, sessions may not last more than 60 legislative days, and cannot extend beyond April 15. In odd-numbered years, sessions may not last more than 30 legislative days, and cannot extend beyond March 30. Special sessions may be called by the Governor of Kentucky at any time and for any duration.

History
The first meeting of the General Assembly occurred in 1792, shortly after Kentucky was granted statehood. Legislators convened in Lexington, the state's temporary capital. Among the first orders of business was choosing a permanent state capital. In the end, the small town of Frankfort, with their offer to provide a temporary structure to house the legislature and a cache of materials for constructing a permanent edifice, was chosen, and the state's capital has remained there ever since.

After women gained suffrage in Kentucky, Mary Elliott Flanery was elected to the Kentucky House of Representative from the 89th District, representing Boyd County, Kentucky. When Flanery took her seat in January 1922, she was the first female state legislator elected in Kentucky and the first female legislator elected south of the Mason–Dixon line.

Operation Boptrot lead to the conviction of more than a dozen legislators between 1992 and 1995. The investigation also led to reform legislation being passed in 1993.

The Civil War

Due to the strong Union sympathies of a majority of the commonwealth's citizens and elected officials, Kentucky remained officially neutral during the Civil War. Even so, a group of Confederate sympathizers met in Russellville in November 1861, to establish a Confederate government for the state. The group established a Confederate state capital in Bowling Green, but never successfully displaced the elected General Assembly in Frankfort.

Assassination of Governor Goebel

The General Assembly played a decisive role in the disputed gubernatorial election of 1899. Initial vote tallies had Republican William S. Taylor leading Democrat William Goebel by a scant 2,383 votes. The General Assembly, however, wielded the final authority in election disputes. With a majority in both houses, the Democrats attempted to invalidate enough votes to give the election to Goebel. During the contentious days that followed, an unidentified assassin shot Goebel as he approached the state capitol.

As Goebel hovered on the brink of death, chaos ensued in Frankfort, and further violence threatened. Taylor, serving as governor pending a final decision on the election, called out the militia and ordered the General Assembly into a special session, not in Frankfort, but in London, Kentucky, a Republican area of the state. The Republican minority naturally heeded the call and headed to London. Democrats predictably resisted the call, many retiring to Louisville instead. Both factions claimed authority, but the Republicans were too few in number to muster a quorum.

Goebel died four days after receiving the fatal shot, and the election was eventually contested to the U.S. Supreme Court, who ruled the General Assembly's actions legal and made Goebel's lieutenant governor, J. C. W. Beckham, governor of the state.

Houses
The General Assembly is bicameral, consisting of a Senate and a House of Representatives. The House and Senate chambers are on opposite ends of the third floor of the capitol building, and legislators have offices in the nearby Capitol Annex building.

Section 33 of the Kentucky Constitution requires that the General Assembly divide the state into 38 Senate and 100 House districts. Districts are required to be as nearly equal in population as possible. Districts can be formed by joining more than one county, but the counties forming a district must be contiguous. Districts must be reviewed every 10 years and be re-divided if necessary.

Under the state constitution, only three counties may be divided to form a Senate district—Jefferson (Louisville), Fayette (Lexington) and Kenton (Covington).

Senate

The Senate is the upper house of the General Assembly.

Terms and qualifications
According to Section 32 of the Kentucky Constitution, a state senator must:
be at least 30 years old;
be a citizen of Kentucky;
have resided in the state at least 6 years and the district at least 1 year prior to election.

Under section 30 of the Kentucky Constitution, senators are elected to four year staggered terms, with half the Senate elected every two years.

Leadership
Prior to a 1992 constitutional amendment, the Lieutenant Governor of Kentucky presided over the Senate; the 1992 amendment created a new office of President of the Senate to be held by one of the 38 senators.

President (elected by full body): Robert Stivers (R-25)
President Pro-Tempore (elected by full body): David P. Givens (R-9)

Additionally, each party elects a floor leader, whip, and caucus chair.

House of Representatives

The House of Representatives is the lower house of the General Assembly. Section 47 of the Kentucky Constitution stipulates that all bills for raising revenue must originate in the House of Representatives.

Terms and qualifications
According to Section 32 of the Kentucky Constitution, a state representative must:
be at least 24 years old;
be a citizen of Kentucky
have resided in the state at least 2 years and the district at least 1 year prior to election.

Per section 30 of the Kentucky Constitution, representatives are elected every two years in the November following a regular session of the General Assembly.

Leadership
Speaker (elected by full body): David Osborne (R-59)
Speaker Pro Tempore (elected by full body): David Meade (R-80)

Additionally, each party elects a floor leader, whip, and caucus chair.

Standing committees

Senate Standing Committees and Chairs
 AGRICULTURE, Sen. Paul Hornback
 APPROPRIATIONS & REVENUE, Sen. Christian McDaniel
 Senate Budget Review Subcommittee on Economic Development and Tourism, Natural Resources and Environmental Protection: Sen. Chris Girdler
 Senate Budget Review Subcommittee on Education: Rep. Stephen West
 Senate Budget Review Subcommittee on General Government, Finance, and Public Protection: Sen. Danny Carroll
 Senate Budget Review Subcommittee on Human Resources: Sen. Ralph Alvarado
 Senate Budget Review Subcommittee on Justice and Judiciary: Sen. Wil Schroder
 Senate Budget Review Subcommittee on Transportation: Sen. Max Wise
 BANKING & INSURANCE, Sen. Tom Buford
 COMMITTEE ON COMMITTEES, Sen. Robert Stivers II
 ECONOMIC DEVELOPMENT, TOURISM, AND LABOR, Sen. Alice Forgy Kerr
 EDUCATION, Sen. Mike Wilson
 ENROLLMENT, Sen. Max Wise
 HEALTH & WELFARE, Sen. Julie Raque Adams
 JUDICIARY, Sen. Whitney Westerfield
 LICENSING, OCCUPATIONS, & ADMINISTRATIVE REGULATIONS, Sen. John Schickel
 NATURAL RESOURCES & ENERGY, Sen. Jared Carpenter
 RULES, Sen. Robert Stivers II
 STATE & LOCAL GOVERNMENT, Sen. Joe Bowen
 TRANSPORTATION, Sen. Ernie Harris
 VETERANS, MILITARY AFFAIRS, & PUBLIC PROTECTION, Sen. Albert Robinson

House Standing Committees and Chairs

 AGRICULTURE, Rep. Richard Heath
 APPROPRIATIONS & REVENUE, Rep. Steven Rudy
 House Budget Review Subcommittee on Economic Development, Public Protection, Tourism, and Energy, Rep. Jill York
 House Budget Review Subcommittee on General Government, Rep. Suzanne Miles
 House Budget Review Subcommittee on Health and Family Services, Rep. Russell Webber
 House Budget Review Subcommittee on Justice, Public Safety, & Judiciary, Rep. Jason Nemes
 House Budget Review Subcommittee on Personnel, Public Retirement, and Finance, Rep. Brian Linder
 House Budget Review Subcommittee on Postsecondary Education, Rep. James Tipton
 House Budget Review Subcommittee on Primary and Secondary Education and Workforce Investment, Rep. Regina Bunch
 House Budget Review Subcommittee on Transportation, Rep. Sal Santoro
 BANKING & INSURANCE, Rep. Bart Rowland
 COMMITTEE ON COMMITTEES, Rep. Jeff Hoover
 ECONOMIC DEVELOPMENT & WORKFORCE INVESTMENT: Rep. Jim DeCesare
 EDUCATION: Rep. John Carney
 ELECTIONS, CONST. AMENDMENTS & INTERGOVERNMENTAL AFFAIRS: Rep. Kenny Imes
 ENROLLMENT: Rep. Donna Mayfield
 HEALTH and Family Services: Rep. Addia Wuchner
 JUDICIARY: Rep. Joseph M. Fischer
 LICENSING, OCCUPATIONS, & ADMIN REGS: Rep. Adam Koenig
 LOCAL GOVERNMENT: Rep. Michael Meredith
 NATURAL RESOURCES & ENERGY: Rep. Jim Gooch, Jr.
 RULES: Rep. Jeff Hoover
 SMALL BUSINESS & INFORMATION TECHNOLOGY: Rep. Diane St. Onge
 STATE GOVERNMENT: Rep. Jerry T. Miller
 TOURISM & OUTDOOR RECREATION: Rep. Tommy Turner
 TRANSPORTATION: Rep. Marie Rader
 VETERANS, MILITARY AFFAIRS, & PUBLIC PROTECTION: Rep. Tim Moore

Legislative Research Commission
The Kentucky General Assembly is served by a 16-member nonpartisan agency called the Legislative Research Commission (LRC). Created in 1948, the LRC provides the General Assembly with staff and research support including committee staffing, bill drafting, oversight of the state budget and educational reform, production of educational materials, maintenance of a reference library and Internet site, and the preparation and printing of research reports, informational bulletins and a legislative newspaper. It is led by the elected leadership of the Democratic and Republican parties in both the Kentucky House of Representatives and the Kentucky Senate, while the agency is run on a day-to-day basis by a Director.

See also

Kentucky Senate
Kentucky House of Representatives
Government of Kentucky

References

External links
Kentucky Legislature Home Page
Kentucky Revised Statutes
Kentucky Educational Television General Assembly page

 
Bicameral legislatures